Candidella is a genus of corals belonging to the family Primnoidae.

The species of this genus are found in Atlantic and Pacific Ocean.

Species:

Candidella gigantea 
Candidella helminthophora 
Candidella imbricata 
Candidella johnsoni

References

Primnoidae
Octocorallia genera